Ibrahim Okasha (born 1911) was an Egyptian athlete. He competed in the men's javelin throw at the 1936 Summer Olympics.

References

External links
 

1911 births
Year of death missing
Athletes (track and field) at the 1936 Summer Olympics
Egyptian male javelin throwers
Olympic athletes of Egypt